Javier Álvarez is the name of:

 Javier Álvarez (composer) (born 1956), Mexican composer 
 Javier Álvarez (runner) (born 1943), Spanish long-distance runner
 Javier Álvarez (sprint canoeist) (born 1967), Spanish sprint canoeist
 Javier Álvarez (songwriter) (born 1969), Spanish songwriter